Martin Procházka (born 15 August 1969) is a retired Czech football striker.

A youth international for Czechoslovakia, Procházka was a squad member at the 1989 FIFA World Youth Championship.

References

1969 births
Living people
Czech footballers
SK Slavia Prague players
FC Hradec Králové players
FK Jablonec players
Czech First League players
Association football forwards
Czechoslovakia youth international footballers
Czechoslovak footballers